Sione Latu Talakai (born 26 December 1989) is a Tongan rugby union player who generally plays as a prop represents Tonga internationally and plays for Australian Shute Shield club Eastwood. He was included in the Tongan squad for the 2019 Rugby World Cup which is held in Japan for the first time and also marks his first World Cup appearance. He helped captain the Wests Bulldogs to a premiership in 2022.

Career 
He made his international debut for Tonga against Wales on 16 June 2017. He was also part of the Tongan team which emerged as runners-up to Fiji at the 2017 World Rugby Pacific Nations Cup.

References 

1989 births
Living people
Tongan rugby union players
Tonga international rugby union players
Rugby union props